The 2004 Mid-Eastern Athletic Conference baseball tournament began on April 29 and ended on May 2 at Cracker Jack Stadium, on the campus of in Lake Buena Vista, Florida.  It was a seven-team double elimination tournament.   won the tournament, as they had done each year since 1999.  The Wildcats claimed the Mid-Eastern Athletic Conference's automatic bid to the 2004 NCAA Division I baseball tournament.

Format and seeding
The teams were seeded one through seven based on conference winning percentage only, with the top seed receiving a single bye while the second seed played the seventh seed, third seed played the sixth, and so on for first round matchups.  The winners advanced in the winners' bracket, while first round losers played elimination games.

Bracket and results

Game results

All-Tournament Team
The following players were named to the All-Tournament Team.

Outstanding Performer
Jon Roberts was named Tournament Outstanding Performer.  Roberts was an outfielder for Bethune-Cookman.

References

Tournament
Mid-Eastern Athletic Conference Baseball Tournament
Mid-Eastern Athletic Conference Baseball